Robert Martin ( – 9 March 1917) was a Scottish golfer from St Andrews. He was runner-up in The Open Championship at Prestwick in 1875 and he won the Open at St Andrews in 1876 and 1885.

Early life
Martin was born at Cupar, Scotland, circa 1853.

Golf career
Martin was a frequent competitor in The Open Championship in the late 19th century. In total, he had ten top-10 finishes including wins in the 1876 and 1885 Open Championship tournaments.

Death
He died on 9 March 1917 at Strathkinness, Scotland, of pulmonary tuberculosis.

Major championships

Wins (2)

1 Strath failed to participate in the playoff, so Martin won by default.

Results timeline

Note: Martin played only in The Open Championship.

DNP = Did not play
"T" indicates a tie for a place
Green background for wins
Yellow background for top-10

References

Scottish male golfers
Winners of men's major golf championships
Golfers from St Andrews
20th-century deaths from tuberculosis
Tuberculosis deaths in Scotland
1853 births
1917 deaths